Céline Goberville (born September 19, 1986) is a French sport shooter. She won silver in the women's 10 metre air pistol at the 2012 Summer Olympics.

She represented France at the 2020 Summer Olympics.

References

External links
Official web site

Living people
1986 births
French female sport shooters
Olympic silver medalists for France
Shooters at the 2012 Summer Olympics
Shooters at the 2016 Summer Olympics
Olympic medalists in shooting
Olympic shooters of France
Medalists at the 2012 Summer Olympics
Knights of the Ordre national du Mérite
Shooters at the 2015 European Games
European Games competitors for France
Mediterranean Games gold medalists for France
Mediterranean Games medalists in shooting
Competitors at the 2013 Mediterranean Games
Shooters at the 2019 European Games
Shooters at the 2020 Summer Olympics
21st-century French women